{{Infobox political party
| colorcode        = 
| name             = Ittihad Party
| native_name      = حزب الاتحاد
| logo             = 
| leader1_title    = Founder
| leader1_name     = Mohamed Tawfik Naseem Pasha
| foundation       = 
| dissolution      = 
| split            = Wafd Party
| headquarters     = Al-Azhar Mosque, Cairo
| newspaper        = Al-IttihadAl-Shab al-Masri
| ideology         = Egyptian nationalismIslamic democracyTraditionalism
| position         = Right-wing
| religion         = Sunni Islam
| international    = Muslim Brotherhood 
| colours          =  Blue
| country          = Egypt
}}Ittihad is separate and distinct from Union Party.

The Ittihad Party or Union Party ("Ettihad Party", Hizb al-Ittihad) was a right-wing political party active in the Kingdom of Egypt.

The party was founded by a group of ulamas with royalist and islamist ideas that legitimized the Sir Lee Stack's assassination in 1924. This group was composed also by young future political leaders like Muhammad Hamid Abu al-Nasr and Aly Maher Pasha. The ideological values were entrencheds in the Egyptian "traditional" culture. The party was gather in the Al-Azhar Mosque.
The Ittihad was financially supported by King Fuad I and British agents, that trusted that the Ittihad would have destabilized the activities of the left-wing radicals. Nevertheless, the Ittihad failed in his goal of built a conservative party, due to his religious views. Its platform was composed mainly by teachers, farmers, ulamas and imams.

The party program was:
Dignified positions of the religious authorities
Better resources for the Egyptian monarchy
Monopoly over the distribution of public and private endowments
Creation of the Awqaf
Strong social values and solidarity
Anti-Western policies

The Ittihad was also tutelaged by Hassan al-Banna's Muslim Brotherhood. After this alliance, the Ittihad became mostly active against Copts, and refused the French Revolution, reputed as anarchy, supported a strong authoritarian state. 
Despite his low electoral results, he party took over the governments of Egypt in 1930s thanks the support of independent politicians present in the House of Representatives.

The party hasn't been a long life and in 1936 was dissolved. Its member adhered mainly to Wafd Party and Muslim Brotherhood.

Electoral results

House of Representatives elections

References

1936 disestablishments in Egypt
Egyptian nationalist parties
Political parties established in 1924
Political parties disestablished in 1936
Conservative parties in Egypt
Islamic political parties in Egypt
Defunct political parties in Egypt
History of the Muslim Brotherhood
1924 establishments in Egypt